"Treehouse of Horror XXVIII" is the fourth episode of the twenty-ninth season of the American animated television series The Simpsons, the 28th episode in the Treehouse of Horror series of Halloween specials, and the 622nd episode of the series overall. It aired in the United States on Fox on October 22, 2017.

Plot

Opening Sequence: The Sweets Hereafter
The Simpson family is in a bowl with other treats left for trick-or-treaters in front of a house on Halloween. When the Barterfinger bar fears being taken, the Marge bar comforts him by saying he is always the last taken, and the Oh Homer! bar adds that even a box of stale raisins gets taken before him. Nelson's Crunch and Kirkish Taffy get taken, and an apple complains about no one ever wanting the apples, as people are afraid of razor blades being inside them. The Marge bar tries to reassure her by saying apples are taken when dipped in caramel, to the apple's disgust. Shauna takes the Senior Mints, after the Oh Homer! bar moves aside to evade her grasp, and eats its contents.

The next day, the Simpsons are the only ones left, and they get placed on a shelf when the residents of the house remove the Halloween decorations. Already on the shelf is a chocolate Easter bunny that tells them they will be left there, forgotten. Seeing his discomfort as no one ever takes him, the Oh Homer! bar starts eating him. The Marge bar tries to stop him, but he tells her chocolate does not feel anything, and resumes eating it, with the rest of the family joining in when he eats the bunny's mouth to silence his objections. The camera pans to the wall, where "The Simpsons Easter Special" is written, but the chocolate from the bunny splatters all over it, covering the words, and dark chocolate resembling blood spells out the episode's title.

The segment was loosely inspired by Sausage Party.

The Exor-Sis
On a pre-Christian temple site in northern Iraq (a parody of the opening scene of The Exorcist), a Pazuzu statue is dug up and sent through Amazon to the Simpsons home due to Homer accidentally ordering it, thinking it said "pizza". After Homer sings a very disturbing lullaby with glowing red eyes, the statue is left on Maggie's bed as the demon within it possesses Maggie, with the possessed infant making her presence known during the cocktail party that Homer and Marge are hosting downstairs. The demon kills a complaining Helen Lovejoy before locking everyone in and then killing Dr. Hibbert while revealing that he is cheating on his wife. Ned Flanders tells the Simpsons that Maggie needs an exorcism before being killed himself from being beaten up and choking on a toy car. An Irish priest arrives soon after, and performs the exorcism that purges the demon from Maggie, but the demon ends up possessing Bart, which he fearfully regrets, declaring that Bart has the evilest soul he has ever seen.

Coralisa
In a parody of Coraline, Maggie is still recovering from Pazuzu while starting to violently vomit all over the dinner table, eventually flooding the kitchen. In Lisa's room, Snowball V (voiced by Neil Gaiman) takes her through a secret tunnel that brings her to another version of the family that have buttons in place of their eyes. While the alternate family are like a dream, Lisa runs back to the real world in terror when she learns they want to sew buttons over her eyes so she can remain with them forever. Lisa reconsiders the alternate family's offer after Homer kills a snake with her saxophone.

A few days later, the family finally realizes Lisa is missing, with Homer accepting it and saying Maggie gets Lisa's room and clothes, while Bart gets her homework. Upon hearing this, Bart escapes through the door and is accepted in the alternate reality. After Marge follows after her children, Homer follows suit and a meeting with the alternate family results with him inadvertently decapitating the alternate Bart while the alternate Homer injures himself on a pair of scissors trying to avenge the former. This infuriates the alternate Marge as she transforms into a spider-like monster to attack Homer, who decides to take advantage of the situation to benefit himself: bringing the surviving members of the alternate family back to the real world with his alternate counterpart attending parent-teacher meetings while the alternate Marge becomes their house's caretaker. Lisa accepts this outcome, claiming that it could have been much worse.

MMM… Homer
Lisa warns viewers about this segment's disgusting content, proclaiming that they may want to watch Game of Thrones afterwards to calm down. The segment, a parody of "Survivor Type", then begins when Homer remains home while the rest of the family go on vacation with Patty and Selma. Homer gets comfy, but ends up eating his food supplies, ending up with only vegetables before finding a frozen hot dog. Losing the hot dog to Santa's Little Helper, Homer accidentally cuts his finger off while grilling. He cooks the finger and eats it. He discovers how tasty it is, losing interest in other food when invited by Ned for lunch, and starts cooking parts of his body before his family come back. They become suspicious with Homer constantly wearing oven mitts to hide his severed fingers, being 20 pounds thinner, and walking with a limp. When Marge discovered Homer's self-cannibalism one night while he was frying his own severed leg, she takes him to an addiction counselor for help, but Mario Batali, in search for new ingredients, convinces a despondent (and now missing the entire lower half of his body) Homer to cook his remaining body parts as ingredients sold at Chez Homer and several other restaurants across Springfield. Carl mentions that they are also eating Barney Gumble, Comic Book Guy, and horse meat. In Heaven, Homer comments to Jesus how he now shares people eating his body with him, as the Springfield residents have turned into cannibals.

Reception
This episode received mostly mixed reviews. Dennis Perkins of The A.V. Club gave the episode a B− stating, "The 28th ‘Treehouse Of Horror’ carries on the venerable Simpsons institution by, as ever, tossing a whole lot of stuff at the screen and seeing what sticks. To that end, this year’s outing gives us: An 'Exorcist' parody, a 'Coraline’  parody, Homer eating human flesh (just his own, but still), stop-motion segments, horror and fantasy-specific guest stars, a little light Fox standards-pushing (Homer does, as stated, eat human flesh), and the usual string of hit-or-miss gags. That last part isn’t really a criticism in itself. Freed up from the need to calibrate the heart-yucks equation, a ‘Treehouse Of Horror’ rises or falls on the strength of its jokes, although the annual Halloween anthology provides its own unique degree of difficulty."

Jesse Schedeen of IGN gave the episode an 8.6 out of 10 stating, "The ‘Treehouse of Horror’ specials are rarely among the more memorable episodes in any given season of The Simpsons. However, Season 29 is likely to be a major exception. All three segments in this year's special were strong. The series finally plugged two major holes in its huge collection of horror movie parodies while also reminding us that it can offend and disturb with the best of them. Perhaps there's still more mileage to be found in this long-running Simpsons trope."

Tony Sokol of Den of Geek gave the episode four out of five stars stating, "’Treehouse of Horror XXVIII’ had chills and spills, which Marge, of course, has to clean, but the thrills were only middling. It was a very funny episode, yes. It took chances, like leaving a kid alone with a catholic [sic] priest, but ultimately doesn’t reach the dizzying highs, terrifying lows nor the creamy middles of Halloweens past. It’s better than a Butterfinger, but doesn’t have a long-enough lasting aftertaste."

"Treehouse of Horror XXVIII" scored a 1.6 rating with a 6 share and was watched by 3.66 million people, making it Fox's highest rated show of the night.

References

External links
 

2017 American television episodes
The Simpsons (season 29) episodes
Treehouse of Horror
Television episodes about exorcism
Television episodes about parallel universes
Easter Bunny in television
Halloween television episodes